Frédéric Daerden (born 11 January 1970, in Montegnée) is a Belgian politician and a member of the French-speaking Socialist Party.

Daerden has been mayor of Herstal since 2006 and a member of the European Parliament since 2009.

He is the son of Michel Daerden (1949–2012).

External links
 Personal website

1970 births
Living people
MEPs for Belgium 2009–2014
Socialist Party (Belgium) MEPs
People from Herstal
People from Saint-Nicolas, Liège